Frédéric Louis Henri Oscar Auckenthaler (29 September 1899 – 18 February 1946) was a Swiss ice hockey player who competed in the 1924 Winter Olympics. In 1924 he participated with the Swiss ice hockey team in the Winter Olympics tournament.

See also
List of Olympic men's ice hockey players for Switzerland

References

1899 births
1946 deaths
Ice hockey players at the 1924 Winter Olympics
Olympic ice hockey players of Switzerland
Sportspeople from Lausanne
Swiss ice hockey right wingers